The 2020 San Marino local elections were held on 29 November, to elect the mayors and the councils of the 9 municipalities of San Marino.
These elections were initially scheduled to take place on 15 December 2019, but were postponed to 21 June 2020 due to a snap general election called for 8 December. Due to the COVID-19 pandemic, elections were postponed once again to 29 November 2020.

In September 2020, the Grand and General Council approved the passive suffrage for foreigners having resided in San Marino for a period of at least 10 years, as well a reduction of seats in the municipal councils.

Election system
Active and passive suffrage was entitled to resident Sammarineses over 18 years old, as well as foreigners having resided in San Marino for at least 10 years.
Voters elected the mayor (Italian: capitano di castello) and the municipal council (giunta di castello). The number of councillors is defined according to the population: 

Candidates for the municipal councils ran on lists led by a mayoral candidate. Voters elected a list and were allowed to give up to two preferential votes. Seats were allocated with the d'Hondt method if the winner had obtained at least 62.5% of the votes. Otherwise, five seats would have been allocated to the winning party (four seats if the council had six members) and the rest of the seats would have been allocated using the d'Hondt method to the rest of the parties. The mayoral candidate of the winning list was proclaimed mayor.

In case of a tie for the first position, a second round would have taken place between the two mayoral candidates. In case of a tie in the second round, the youngest candidate would be elected. In the municipalities where only one list contested the election, the election was considered valid if the turnout was over 35%.

Results
Overall turnout was 41.1%, 4.7pp lower than in 2014. The highest turnout was recorded in the smallest municipalities: Chiesanuova and Montegiardino.

Acquaviva

Borgo Maggiore

Chiesanuova

City of San Marino

Domagnano

Faetano

Fiorentino

Montegiardino

Serravalle

References

External links
 Election results
 Elections in San Marino

Local elections in San Marino
San Marino
Local election